Ernest W. Dunklee (November 29, 1890 – October 25, 1974) was a Vermont farmer and politician who served as President of the Vermont State Senate.

Biography
Ernest Walter Dunklee was born in Vernon, Vermont on November 29, 1890. He attended school in Vernon and graduated from Mount Hermon Boys' School, afterwards operating a farm in Vernon.  In 1904 he served as a page in the Vermont Senate.

A Republican, Dunklee served in local offices including town lister.

Dunklee served four terms in the Vermont House of Representatives: 1919 to 1921, 1923 to 1925, and 1933 to 1937. From 1925 to 1927 Dunklee served in the Vermont Senate.

Dunklee was again elected to the Vermont Senate in 1936. He served two terms, 1937 to 1941. From 1937 to 1939 he served as Senate President.

Ernest W. Dunklee died in Vernon on October 25, 1974. He is buried in Vernon's Tyler Cemetery.

References 

1890 births
1974 deaths
People from Vernon, Vermont
Republican Party members of the Vermont House of Representatives
Republican Party Vermont state senators
Presidents pro tempore of the Vermont Senate
Burials in Vermont
20th-century American politicians